is a fighting game developed by Capcom and originally released for arcades in 1991. It is the second installment in the Street Fighter series and the sequel to 1987's Street Fighter. It is Capcom's fourteenth game to use the CP System arcade system board. Street Fighter II improved many of the concepts introduced in the first game, including the use of special command-based moves, a combo system, a six-button configuration, and a wider selection of playable characters, each with a unique fighting style. 

It prominently features a popular two-player mode that obligates direct, human-to-human competitive play which prolonged the survival of the declining video game arcade business market by stimulating business and driving the fighter genre. It inspired grassroots tournament events, culminating into Evolution Championship Series (EVO). Street Fighter II shifted the arcade competitive dynamic from achieving personal-best high scores to head-to-head competition, including large groups.

Street Fighter II became the best-selling game since the golden age of arcade video games. By 1994, it had been played by at least 25 million people in the United States alone. Due to its major success, a series of updated versions were released with additional features and characters. Worldwide, more than 200,000 arcade cabinets and 15million software units of all versions of Street Fighter II have been sold, grossing an estimated  in total revenue, making it one of the top three highest-grossing video games of all time  and the best-selling fighting game until 2019. More than 6.3 million SNES cartridges of Street Fighter II have been sold, making it Capcom's best-selling single software game for the next two decades, its best-selling game on a single platform, and the highest-selling third-party game on the SNES.

Street Fighter II is regarded as one of the greatest video games of all time and the most important and influential fighting game ever made. Its launch is seen as a revolutionary moment within its genre, credited with popularizing the fighting genre during the 1990s and inspiring other producers to create their own fighting series. It sparked a renaissance for the arcade video game industry and impacted competitive video gaming and wider popular culture such as films and music.

Gameplay

Street Fighter II follows several conventions and rules established by its 1987 predecessor Street Fighter. The player engages opponents in one-on-one close quarter combat in a series of best-two-out-of-three matches. The objective of each round is to deplete the opponent's vitality before the timer runs out. Both fighters having equal vitality left yields a "double KO" or "draw game" and additional rounds ensue until sudden death.

In the first Street Fighter II, a match can last up to ten rounds; this was reduced to four rounds since Champion Edition. If there is no clear winner by the end of the final round, either the computer-controlled opponent will win by default in a single-player match or both fighters will lose in a 2-player match. After every third match in the single-player mode, a bonus stage gives additional points including a car-breaking stage, a barrel breaking stage, and a drum-breaking stage. Between the matches, the next match location is selected on a world map.

Like in Street Fighter, the controls are an eight-directional joystick and six attack buttons. The joystick can jump, crouch, walk left and right, and block. A tradeoff of strength and speed are given by three punch buttons and three kick buttons, each of light, medium, and heavy. The player can perform a variety of basic moves in any position, including new grabbing and throwing attacks. Special moves are performed by combinations of directional and button-based commands.

Street Fighter II differs from its predecessor due to the selection of multiple playable characters, each with distinct fighting styles and special moves including combos. According to IGN, "the concept of combinations, linked attacks that can't be blocked when they're timed correctly, came about more or less by accident. Street Fighter IIs designers didn't quite mean for it to happen, but players of the original game eventually found out that certain moves naturally flowed into other ones." This combo system was later adopted as a standard feature of fighting games and was expanded upon in this series.

Plot
The leader of the Shadaloo organization, M. Bison, in his global domination plan sets up a world fighting tournament, to select the best fighters to work in his Shadaloo organization through brainwashing.

M. Bison's plans are foiled by Akuma (who was not a competitor in the tournament) who catches him off guard and performs the Shun Goku Satsu on him, killing the Shadaloo boss in an instant. Akuma then takes M. Bison's place in the tournament to fight the finalist, who some sources hint is Ryu. Akuma mocks M. Bison for being the slave of his own power, not knowing that he is actually in absolute control of his Psycho Power.

Characters
The original Street Fighter II features a roster of eight playable World Warriors. This includes Ryu and Ken—the main protagonists from Street Fighter—plus six new international newcomers. In the single-player tournament, the player fights the other seven main fighters, then the final opponentsa group of four CPU-only opponents known as the Grand Masters, which includes Sagat from Street Fighter.

Playable characters:

 , a Japanese martial artist seeking no fame or even the crown of "champion", but only to hone his Shotokan Karate skills with the inner power of Chi, he dedicates his life to perfect his own potential while abandoning everything else in life such as having no family, and few friends, his only bond is with Ken. He is the winner of the previous tournament. He is not convinced that he is the greatest fighter in the world and comes to this tournament in search of fresh competition.
 E. Honda, a sumo wrestler from Japan. He aims to improve the negative reputation of sumo wrestling by proving competitors to be legitimate athletes.
  Blanka, a beast-like mutant from Brazil who was raised in the jungle. He enters the tournament to uncover more origins about his forgotten past.
 Guile, a former United States Air Force special forces operative seeking to defeat M. Bison, who killed his best friend Charlie.
 Ken, Ryu's best friend, greatest rival and former training partner, from the United States. Ryu's personal challenge rekindled Ken's fighting spirit and persuaded him to enter the World Warrior tournament, as well as feeling lackadaisical in his fighting potential due to spending too much time with his fiancée.
 Chun-Li, a Chinese martial artist who works as an Interpol officer. Much like Guile, she does not enter the World Warrior tournament for any personal glory except proving that she can defeat any man who challenges her. Chun-Li's ambition in the past was tracking down the movements of the smuggling operation known as Shadaloo. Her goal now is her trail being led to the tournament by seeking to avenge her deceased father by holding the Grand Master's leader of the crime syndicate responsible.
 Zangief, a professional wrestler and sambo fighter from the Soviet Union. He aims to prove "Soviet Strength" is the strongest form of strength, particularly by defeating American opponents with his bare hands.
 Dhalsim, a fire-breathing yoga master from India. Even though he is a pacifist, he uses the money earned from fighting in order to lift people out of poverty.

CPU-exclusive characters, in the order of appearance:

 Balrog, an American boxer with a similar appearance to Mike Tyson. Called M. Bison in Japan. Once one of the world's greatest heavyweight boxers, he began working for Shadaloo for easy money.
 Vega, a Spanish bullfighter who wields a claw and uses a unique style of ninjutsu. Called Balrog in Japan. He is vain and wishes to eliminate ugly people from the world.
 Sagat, a Muay Thai kickboxer from Thailand and former World Warrior champion from the original Street Fighter. He was once known as The King of Street Fighters until he got demoted as The King of Muai Thai in his own tournament due to a narrow defeat at the hands of Ryu's shoryuken (rising dragon punch) which left a deep gash across his chest. Ever since that moment he felt disgrace, and will do anything to have a grudge match with Ryu to get his title back, even if it takes joining forces with Shadaloo.
 M. Bison, the leader of the criminal organization Shadaloo, who uses a mysterious power known as Psycho Power, and the final opponent of the game. Called Vega in Japan.

Takayuki Nakayama stated in an interview that many character design ideas were trialled and dropped along the development process. Rejected character designs for Street Fighter II included a bullfighter and an American amateur wrestler.

Regional differences
With the exception of Sagat, the Shadaloo Bosses have different names in the Japanese version. The African-American boxer known as Balrog in the international versions was designed as a pastiche of real-life boxer Mike Tyson and was originally named M. Bison (short for "Mike Bison", with "Mike" being one of the American opponents faced in Street Fighter). Vega and M. Bison were originally named Balrog and Vega, respectively. When Street Fighter II was localized for the overseas market, the names of the bosses were rotated, out of concern that the boxer's similarities to Tyson could have led to a likeness infringement lawsuit. This name change was carried over to future games in the series. To avoid confusion in tournament play, many players refer to each character by a defining characteristic. The names are "Claw" to refer to the character from Spain, "Boxer" to refer to the African-American boxer, and "Dictator" to refer to the final boss.

The characters in the Japanese version have more than one win quote and if the player loses a match against the CPU in the Japanese version, a random playing tip will be shown at the bottom of the continue screen. While the ending text for the characters was originally translated literally, a few changes were made due to creative differences from Capcom's U.S. marketing staff. For example, the name of Guile's fallen friend (who later debuted as a playable fighter in Street Fighter Alpha) was changed from Nash to Charlie, since a staff member from Capcom USA said that Nash is not a natural sounding English name.

Development
Although the original punching-pad cabinet of Street Fighter had not been very popular, the alternate six-button version was more successful, which began to generate interest in a sequel. Capcom began to make fighting games a priority after Final Fight was commercially successful in the United States. Yoshiki Okamoto recounted, "The basic idea at Capcom was to revive Street Fighter, a good game concept, to make it a better-playing arcade game."

Development of Street Fighter II took about two years and about 35 to 40 people, with Noritaka Funamizu as a producer, and Akira Nishitani and Akira Yasuda in charge of the game and character design, respectively.

Funamizu notes that the developers did not particularly prioritize Street Fighter IIs balance; he primarily ascribes the game's success to its appealing animation patterns. The quality of animation benefited from the developers' use of the CPS-1 hardware, with advantages including allowing different characters to occupy different amounts of memory. For example, Ryu can occupy 8 megabits and Zangief 12 megabits.

The combo system came about by accident:

The vast majority of in-game music was composed by Yoko Shimomura. This is ultimately the only game in the series on which Shimomura worked, as she left the company for Square two years later. Isao Abe, a Capcom newcomer, handled a few additional tracks ("Versus Screen", "Sagat's Theme", and "Here Comes A New Challenger") for Street Fighter II and became the main composer on the subsequent versions. The sound programming and sound effects were overseen by Yoshihiro Sakaguchi, the composer on Street Fighter.

Location testing began in Japan. It was then exhibited in the United Kingdom at London's Amusement Trades Exhibition International (ATEI) in January 1991. The same month, Capcom held a two-week location test in North America, before unveiling the game at Capcom's distributor conference on February 1, 1991, held at Marriott Harbor Beach, Fort Lauderdale, Florida. Capcom introduced Street Fighter II as its "greatest video game ever".

Ports

Super NES
Street Fighter II was released for the Super Famicom on June 10, 1992, in Japan, followed by a North American release for the SNES in August and a European release in December. It is the first game released on a 16-megabit SNES cartridge. Many aspects from the arcade versions were either changed or simplified in order to fit into the smaller memory capacity. This version has a secret code allowing both players to control the same character in a match, which is not possible in the original arcade version. The second player uses the same alternate color palette introduced in Street Fighter II: Champion Edition. The four Shadaloo Bosses are still non-playable, but the code enables their Champion Edition color palette. Tatsuya Nishimura, who had recently joined Capcom from TOSE, arranged the soundtrack with assistance from Shimomura, Abe, and Sakaguchi.

The American SNES cartridge was re-released in November 2017 as a limited edition item to celebrate the 30th anniversary of the Street Fighter series.

Home computers
U.S. Gold released versions of Street Fighter II for various home computer platforms in Europe, namely the Amiga, Atari ST, Commodore 64, PC (DOS), and ZX Spectrum. These were all developed by Creative Materials, except the ZX Spectrum version by Tiertex Design Studios. The PC version was also published in North America by Hi-Tech Expressions.  These versions suffer numerous inaccuracies, such as missing graphical assets and music tracks, miscolored palettes, and lack of six-button controls due to these platforms having only one or two-button joysticks as standard at the time. Though officially advertised by US Gold along with the C64 and ZX Spectrum conversions and anticipated in magazines, the Amstrad CPC development by Creative Materials was canceled.

Game Boy
The Game Boy version of Street Fighter II was released on August 11, 1995, in Japan, and in September 1995 internationally. It is missing Dhalsim, E. Honda, and Vega. The graphics, character portraits, and stages are based on Super Street Fighter II, although some moves (such as Blanka's Amazon River Run) from Super Street Fighter II Turbo are included. Because the Game Boy only has two buttons, the strength of punches and kicks is determined by the duration of button presses.

Compilations
Street Fighter II, Champion Edition, and Turbo are in the compilation Capcom Generation 5 for the PlayStation and Sega Saturn, which was released in North America and Europe as Street Fighter Collection 2. All three games are in Capcom Classics Collection Vol. 1 for the PlayStation 2 and Xbox, and in Capcom Classics Collection Reloaded for the PlayStation Portable.

Updates
Street Fighter II spawned a series of revisions, each refining the play mechanics, graphics, character roster, and other aspects of the game. The first update, Street Fighter II: Champion Edition, was released in arcades in March 1992. It rebalances characters' power levels, allows both players in two-player matches to select the same character (distinguished by alternate costume colors) and allows players to choose the four previously computer-only boss characters.

Following the release of Champion Edition, a wave of unauthorized modifications for arcade cabinets, such as the so-called "Rainbow Edition", appeared, prompting Capcom's official response with Street Fighter II Turbo in December, increasing the playing speed and giving some characters new special moves.

Super Street Fighter II: The New Challengers was released in September 1993, using the more advanced CP System II, allowing for updated graphics and audio, and introducing four new characters, but relieving the speed increase of Street Fighter II Turbo, which led to it being quickly superseded by Super Street Fighter II Turbo, released in February 1994, which allows for a selective game speed, introduces powered-up special moves called Super Combos, and adds a new hidden character.

All arcade Street Fighter II games have been ported to various platforms, as individual releases and in compilations. Later home versions further revise or expand the game, including Hyper Street Fighter II (which was later given an arcade release) and Super Street Fighter II Turbo HD Remix. Ultra Street Fighter II: The Final Challengers was released for Nintendo Switch and adds two (later three) characters who previously debuted outside Street Fighter II updates.

In addition to official updated versions, numerous counterfeit modified versions of Street Fighter II were in wide circulation. For example, nine different counterfeit versions were available on Super Famicom in Japan by December 1992.

Reception

Commercial
By 1994, Street Fighter II had been played by at least 25 million people in the United States alone, across arcades and homes. , it is one of the top three highest-grossing video games of all time, along with Space Invaders (1978) and Pac-Man (1980).

Arcade versions
Street Fighter II was not immediately successful in Japan, as most arcade players were initially playing it solo, rather than multiplayer as originally intended. Yoshiki Okamoto was disappointed with its initial performance, and was told he should have produced another solo beat 'em up like Final Fight instead. After Japanese arcade magazine Gamest began publishing articles informing readers about the "battle play" feature, the game began gaining considerable popularity in Japanese arcades. In Japan, Game Machine magazine listed the game on their April 1, 1991 issue as being the second most-successful table arcade cabinet of the month, outperforming games such as Detana!! TwinBee and King of the Monsters, before Street Fighter II topped the charts two weeks later. It went on to become the highest-grossing arcade game of 1991 in Japan, and then it again became the highest-grossing arcade game of 1992. Street Fighter II Turbo became the highest-grossing arcade game of 1993, with Street Fighter II Dash (Champion Edition) at number four and The World Warrior at number nine.

Street Fighter II was similarly successful in the Western world. By March, it had become a blockbuster and the top-grossing game in the United States, giving a substantial boost in earnings for street operators. It topped the RePlay arcade software charts from May 1991 through August 1992, for a total of 16 months. On the Play Meter arcade charts, it was the top-grossing video game during JanuaryFebruary 1992 and May 1992. Street Fighter II was the highest-grossing arcade game of 1991 in the United States, and one of the top five highest-grossing arcade conversion kits of 1992 (below Champion Edition). Its success was considered phenomenal; by 1992, it had turned around the convenience store segment of the coin-op industry and become the best-selling arcade game in ten years. Electronic Games noted in its October 1992 issue, "Not since the early 1980s has an arcade game received so much attention and all-out fanatical popularity." It was similarly successful in Australia, where it was performing strongly after 16 months on the market, with Leisure Line magazine noting in 1992 that not "since the days of Space Invaders (1978) has a game had such longevity".

In 1991, 50,000 arcade units were sold worldwide, including 17,000 units in Japan, with Capcom reporting continued production of arcade units due to repeat orders. In the United Kingdom, Your Commodore reported in July 1991 that spectators were betting on players at London West End arcades.

The company sold more than 60,000 arcade machines of the original Street Fighter II, including about 20,000 to 25,000 units in the United States. It was followed by Street Fighter II′ (Dash or Champion Edition), of which 140,000 arcade units were sold in Japan alone, where it cost ¥160,000 ($1300) for each unit, amounting to ¥22.4 billion ($182 million) revenue generated from hardware sales in Japan (equivalent to $ in ), in addition to about 20,000 to 25,000 units sold in the United States. On the US RePlay arcade charts for July 1992, Champion Edition was number one on the upright cabinets chart (above Midway's Mortal Kombat) while the original Street Fighter II was number two on the coin-op software chart (below SNK's World Heroes). Street Fighter II generated  (equivalent to $ in ) annually in 1993, making it the year's highest-grossing entertainment product, above the film Jurassic Park. In January 1994, Capcom referred to Street Fighter II as "the most successful video game series of the decade" while promoting Super Street Fighter II. In early 1994, Capcom projected sales of Super Street Fighter II to reach 100,000 arcade units. According to the March 1995 issue of GameFan magazine, the game had earned "billions of dollars in profit".

In addition to Capcom's official arcade units, many pirated counterfeit Street Fighter II arcade clone units were sold across the world. RePlay noted in January 1993 that Street Fighter II had "single-handedly re-ignited the worldwide black market in counterfeit PCBs and speed-up kits". Many counterfeit arcade units often outsold official Street Fighter II arcade cabinets in various markets. For example, about 200,000 counterfeits were in Mexico alone, where Capcom did not officially sell the game. Bondeal from Hong Kong produced 3,000 copied arcade units per month for markets such as Latin America, and a Taiwanese firm produced 20,000 copied arcade units in 1991; in Taiwan, up to 150,000 clone units were manufactured by 1992. Many counterfeit units were in South Korea, such as a trader selling about 100 Street Fighter II PCBs by 1992. Seven different versions of the game claimed to be sequels in 1992, mostly from Hong Kong, and one named Champion of Champion Editions reportedly was in British arcades. Capcom and its partners took legal action against counterfeit arcade units in regions such as Southeast Asia, North America, South Korea, and Puerto Rico.

Home conversions
The numerous home conversions of Street Fighter II are listed among Capcom's Platinum-class games, with more than one million units sold worldwide. It topped the Japanese Famitsu sales charts from June through July to August 1992. It was a multi-million seller in Japan by December 1992.

According to Electronic Gaming Monthly, "Never has a game taken the country [by] storm as this one has." It remained America's top-selling Super NES game for much of late 1992, in August and then October, November, and December. In 1992 in North America,  units were sold. In the United Kingdom, Street Fighter II replaced Super Mario World as the bundled game for the SNES, and the SNES and Amiga versions made it the second best-selling home video game of 1992, below Sonic the Hedgehog 2 for the Mega Drive. The SNES version became the company's best-selling single consumer game software, at more than 6.3 million units, and it remains its best-selling game software on a single platform. By 1993,  units of all home software versions had been sold, and  units for Nintendo and Sega consoles by March 1994.

The SNES versions of Street Fighter II Turbo and Super Street Fighter II had 4.1 million and 2 million unit sales, respectively, followed by the Mega Drive/Genesis version of Street Fighter II: Special Champion Edition with 1.65 million sales. In total, more than 14 million copies were sold for the SNES and Mega Drive/Genesis consoles. The SNES version of Street Fighter II was Capcom's best-selling single game until 2013, when it was surpassed by Resident Evil 5. The Amiga version was successful in the United Kingdom, where it became the best-selling home computer software of 1992, though only being available for the last 16 days of the year. Street Fighter II also topped the UK's Amiga sales chart in January 1993, and the UK's Atari ST chart in March 1993. In 2008, Super Street Fighter II Turbo HD Remix broke both the first-day and first-week sales records for a download-only game. Street Fighter II was the best-selling fighting game with 15.5million units sold across all versions and platforms, until it was surpassed by Super Smash Bros. Ultimate in 2019.

Like the arcades, the home conversions were impacted by copyright infringement. Upon release of the SNES version in 1992, thirteen different unauthorized versions were reportedly available for the Super Famicom.

Critical

Japan
The original arcade version of Street Fighter II was awarded Best Game of 1991 in Gamest magazine's Fifth Annual Grand Prize, which also won in the genre of Best Action Game (the award for fighting games was not established yet). Street Fighter II placed No. 1 in Best VGM, Best Direction, and Best Album, and was second place in Best Graphics below the 3D Namco System 21 game Starblade. All the characters except M. Bison (known internationally as Balrog) are on the list of Best Characters of 1991.

Street Fighter II Dash was awarded Best Game of 1992 in the Sixth Annual Grand Prize, as published in the February 1993 issue of Gamest, winning again as Best Action Game. It placed No. 3 in Best VGM,  No. 6 in Best Graphics, and No. 5 in Best Direction. The Street Fighter II Image Album is the No. 1 Best Album in the same issue, with the Drama CD version of Street Fighter II tied for No. 7 with the soundtrack for Star Blade. The List of Best Characters only had Chun-Li at No. 3.

In the February 1994 issue of Gamest, both Street Fighter II Turbo and Super Street Fighter II were nominated for Best Game of 1993, but neither won (the first place was given to Samurai Spirits). Super ranked third place, and Turbo ranked sixth. In the category of Best Fighting Games, Super ranked third place again, while Turbo placed fifth. Super won third place in the categories of Best Graphics and Best VGM. Cammy, who was introduced in Super, placed fifth place in the list of Best Characters of 1993, with Dee Jay at 36 and T. Hawk at 37. In the January 30, 1995 issue of Gamest, Super Street Fighter II X (known as Super Turbo internationally) placed fourth place in the award for Best Game of 1994 and Best Fighting Game, but did not rank in any of the other awards.

The Super Famicom (SNES) version was critically acclaimed. Famitsus panel of four reviewers gave it scores of 9, 9, 9, and 8, adding up to 35 out of 40. This made it one of their five highest-rated games of 1992, along with Dragon Quest V: Hand of the Heavenly Bride, Shin Megami Tensei, World of Illusion Starring Mickey Mouse and Donald Duck, and Mario Paint. They later gave the Turbo update a score of 36 out of 40. This made Street Fighter II Turbo their highest-rated game of 1993, and the twelfth game to have received a Famitsu score of 36/40 or above.

International
The arcade game was well received by English-language critics upon release. In March 1991, RePlay magazine said "the graphics and sounds are tops" while praising the "solid" gameplay, and it was considered the top game at the American Coin Machine Exposition (ACME) that month. In May 1991, Julian Rignall of Computer and Video Games gave it ratings of 94% for graphics, 93% for sound, 95% for playability, and 92% for lastability, with a 93% score overall. He criticized the original Street Fighter for being a "run-of-the-mill beat 'em up with little in the way of thrills and spills" but praised the sequel for being "absolutely packed with new ideas" and special moves. He noted the "six buttons combining with 8 joystick directions to provide more moves than I've ever seen in a beat 'em up" and praised the "massive, beautifully drawn and animated sprites, tons of speech and the most exciting, action-packed head-to-head conflict yet seen in an arcade game," concluding that it is "one of the best fighting games yet seen in the arcades" and a "brilliant" coin-op. In the June 1991 issue of Sinclair User, John Cook gave the arcade game an "addict factor" of 84%. He praised the gameplay and the "excellent" animation and sound effects, but criticized the controls, stating players "might find the control system a bit daunting at first [with] a joystick plus six (count 'em!) fire buttons [but] it's not that bad really". He concluded "this is bound to appeal to you if you like the beat 'em up style of game." Jeff Davy of Your Commodore praised the game for its large sprites, character animation, varied opponents, character moves, and two-player mode. Computer and Video Games later referred to Street Fighter II as the "game of the millennium" in 1992.

The SNES version of Street Fighter II was very well received. In Electronic Gaming Monthly (EGM), its panel of four reviewers gave it scores of 10, 9, 10, and 9, adding up to 38 out of 40, and their "Game of the Month" award. Sushi-X (Ken Williams) gave it a 10,  calling it "The best! Street Fighter II is the only game I have ever seen that really deserves a 10!" Martin Alessi gave it a 9, describing it as "the best cart available anywhere! Incredible game play!" Ed Semrad gave it a 10, saying "The moves are perfect, the graphics outstanding and the audio exceptional. Get one of the new 6 button sticks and you'll swear you're playing the arcade version." GamePro printed two reviews of the game in its August 1992 issue, both giving it a full score of 5 out of 5; Doctor Dave described it as "Capcom's best arcade conversion yet" while Slasher Quan stated that almost "everything's perfect in the Super NES version" and that it is "a nearly flawless conversion of the arcade original that's made even more enjoyable by new options and the convenience of home fighting." Super Play gave it a 94% score, stating that with "the inclusion of Champion Editions Character vs. Character select and the extra options, I would even go so far to say that this is actually better than the coin-op." Electronic Games gave it scores of 95% for graphics, 92% for sound, and 93% for playability, with a 94% overall, concluding that it is the best fighting game to date. Nintendo Power scored it 16.2 out of 20, stating that the "hottest arcade game around has been faithfully reproduced for this Super NES conversion" and that it "is just like having the arcade game at home!". Nintendo Power ranked it the best SNES game of 1992, above The Legend of Zelda: A Link to the Past in second place.

Computer Gaming World in April 1994 said that "Street Fighter II now enters the PC ring rather late and with a touch of weak wrist". The magazine reported that "the atmosphere and the impact of hefty welts and bone-crushing action is just not here. The usual lament of many PC gamers about arcade conversions is once again true: too little and too late".

Entertainment Weekly wrote that "Sure, it's violent (people can be set on fire), but Street Fighter II offers a depth of play (each character has more than 20 different moves) unmatched by any other video-game slugfest."

Street Fighter II was named by Electronic Gaming Monthly as the Game of the Year for 1992. EGM awarded Street Fighter II Turbo with Best Super NES Game in 1993. Street Fighter II won the Golden Joystick Award for Game of the Year in 1992. Game Informer gave it the "Best Game of the Year" and "Best Playability in a Video Game" awards. It won Electronic Games magazine's Electronic Gaming Award for the Video Game of the Year, where it was nominated along with NHLPA Hockey '93 and Sonic the Hedgehog 2.

The Mega Drive version of Street Fighter II received 10 out of 10 for both graphics and addiction from Mega, who described it as "a candidate for best game ever and without a doubt the best beat-'em-up of all time" and gave it an overall 92% score. MegaTech scored it 95% and awarded it Hyper Game, stating "the greatest coin-op hits the Megadrive in perfect form". Edge gave the PC Engine version of Champion Edition a score of 8 out of 10. The four reviewers of Electronic Gaming Monthly, while remarking that the Game Boy control is difficult, the game speed "lethargically slow", and it is a very old game, agreed it to be an excellent conversion by Game Boy standards. The Axe Grinder of GamePro agreed, praising the graphics and Game Boy survival mode, but criticizing the slow controls and concluding that "The real problem here is that the game's just plain old."

Retrospective

Street Fighter II has been listed among the best games of all time. Game Informer ranked it as the 22nd-best game ever made in 2001. The staff praised it for popularizing the one-on-one fighting game genre and noted that its Super NES ports were "near-perfect." They later ranked it the 25th-best game ever made in 2009. Other publications that listed it among the best games of all time include BuzzFeed, Electronic Gaming Monthly, IGN, Edge, Empire, Famitsu, FHM, G4, GameFAQs, GameSpot, GamingBolt, Guinness World Records, Next Generation, NowGamer, Retro Gamer, Stuff, Time, and Yahoo! Guinness World Records awarded Street Fighter II the world records of "First Fighting Game to Use Combos", "Most Cloned Fighting Game", and "Biggest-Selling Coin-Operated Fighting Game" in the Guinness World Records: Gamer's Edition 2008. In 2017, The Strong National Museum of Play inducted Street Fighter II to its World Video Game Hall of Fame.

GameSpot gave the PlayStation 3 version of HD Remix a score of 8.5 out of 10.

PC Gamer listed the 1993 DOS version of Street Fighter II as one of the worst PC ports.

Legacy

Sequels
The Street Fighter II games were followed by several sub-series of Street Fighter games and spinoffs including Street Fighter Alpha, Street Fighter EX, Street Fighter III, Pocket Fighter, Super Puzzle Fighter II Turbo, and Vs. series. Capcom released Street Fighter IV for the arcades in July 2008, followed by Xbox 360 and PlayStation 3 in February 2009 and Microsoft Windows in July 2009. Street Fighter V was released for the PlayStation 4 and Windows in 2016.

Other media
 The characters joined the G.I. Joe: A Real American Hero lineup in 1993, as Hasbro bought their toy rights.
 An unofficial South Korean animation, Street Fighter, was produced by Daiwon Animation in 1992 and features the cast of Street Fighter II. The Hong Kong movie Future Cops has a renamed cast of Street Fighter II characters.
 Two film adaptations were released in 1994: Street Fighter II: The Animated Movie, a Japanese anime film produced by Group TAC; and Street Fighter, an American live-action film starring Jean-Claude Van Damme.
 A U.S. Street Fighter cartoon follows a combined plot of the live-action movie and the game series. An unrelated anime, Street Fighter II V, features younger characters similar to The Legend of Chun-Li.
 Capcom sponsored car 88 in the 1992 Indianapolis 500, providing a Street Fighter livery, which failed to qualify.

Impact
Street Fighter II is regarded as one of the most influential video games of all time, and the most important fighting game in particular. The release of Street Fighter II in 1991 is often considered a revolutionary moment in the fighting game genre. It has the most accurate joystick and button scanning routine in the genre, allowing players to reliably execute multi-button special moves, and its graphics use Capcom's CPS arcade chipset, with highly detailed characters and stages. Whereas previous games allow players to combat a variety of computer-controlled fighters, Street Fighter II allows human combat.

The popularity of Street Fighter II surprised the gaming industry, as arcade owners bought more machines to keep up with demand. It was responsible for introducing the combo mechanic, which came about when skilled players learned that they could combine several attacks with no time for the opponent to recover. Its success inspired a wave of other fighting games, which were initially often labeled as "clones" or imitators, including titles such as Guardians of the 'Hood, Art of Fighting, Time Killers, Mortal Kombat, and Killer Instinct. Street Fighter II also influenced the development of the combat mechanics of beat 'em up game Streets of Rage 2. However, Street Fighter II also received criticism for its depiction of street violence, and for having inspired numerous other violent games in the industry.

Street Fighter II was the best-selling arcade video game by far since the golden age of arcade video games, bringing an arcade renaissance in the early 1990s. Its impact on home video games was equally important, becoming a long-lasting system-seller for the Super Nintendo Entertainment System. Since then up until the late 1990s, numerous best-selling home video games were arcade ports. In 2005, Electronic Gaming Monthly ranked it the 9th most important game since they began publication in 1989, stating no game "did more to prop up arcades" in the 1990s and it was the first killer app for the SNES.

The game popularized the concept of "face-to-face", tournament-level competition between two players instead of just high scores. This enabled the competitive multiplayer and deathmatch modes found in modern action games. John Romero, for example, cited the competitive multiplayer of Street Fighter II as an influence on the deathmatch mode of seminal first-person shooter Doom.

It is an innovation in revision series, with Capcom continuously upgrading and expanding the arcade game instead of releasing a sequel. This furthered the practice of patches and downloadable content found in modern video games.

Popular culture
Street Fighter II has been frequently sampled and referenced in hip hop music, by artists such as The Lady of Rage, Nicki Minaj, Lupe Fiasco, Dizzee Rascal, Lil B, Sean Price, and Madlib. This started with Hi-C's "Swing'n" (1993) and DJ Qbert's "Track 10" (1994) which sampled Street Fighter II, and the Street Fighter film soundtrack (1994) which is the first major film soundtrack to consist almost entirely of hip hop music. According to DJ Qbert, "I think hip-hop is a cool thing, I think Street Fighter is a cool thing". According to Vice magazine, "Street Fighters mixture of competition, bravado, and individualism easily translate into the trials and travails of a rapper." The "Perfect" sample was used by Kanye West and Drake in The Life of Pablo (2016). UK rap includes grime DJ Logan Sama saying, "Street Fighter is just a huge cultural thing that everyone experienced growing up [with] such a huge impact that it has just stayed in everyone's consciousness." According to Jake Hawkes of Soapbox, "grime was built around lyrical clashes [and] the 1v1 setup of these clashes was easily equated with Street Fighters 1 on 1 battles." Grime MCs such as Dizzee Rascal were sampling Street Fighter II in 2002, and Street Fighter II has been sampled "by almost every grime MC". It became an integral part of BBC Radio 1Xtra DJ Charlie Sloth's Fire in the Booth freestyle segments, using samples such as "Hadouken", "Shoryuken", and the "Perfect" announcer sound.

Notes

References

Further reading

Like a Hurricane: An Unofficial Oral History of Street Fighter II by Matt Leone, published by Thames & Hudson

External links
 Street Fighter II entry at Arcade-History
 

1991 video games
1992 video games
1993 video games
2D fighting games
Amiga games
Arcade video games
Atari ST games
Cancelled Amstrad CPC games
Cancelled Nintendo Entertainment System games
Commodore 64 games
CP System games
DOS games
Game Boy games
Golden Joystick Award winners
IOS games
Java platform games
Street Fighter games
Super Nintendo Entertainment System games
Tiger Electronics handheld games
U.S. Gold games
Fighting games
Video game sequels
Video games developed in Japan
Video games scored by Yoko Shimomura
Video games set in 1991
Video games set in Brazil
Video games set in China
Video games set in India
Video games set in Jamaica
Video games set in Japan
Video games set in Mexico
Video games set in Spain
Video games set in Thailand
Video games set in the Soviet Union
Video games set in the United States
Video games with alternate endings
Video games with alternative versions
Virtual Console games for Wii U
ZX Spectrum games
Golden Joystick Award for Game of the Year winners
J2ME games
Virtual Console games for Wii
World Video Game Hall of Fame
Tiertex Design Studios games
Multiplayer and single-player video games